Two ships of the Royal Navy have borne the name HMS Mystic

She was sold in 1921.
  was an  launched in 1944 and scrapped in 1958.

Royal Navy ship names